The 1997 Castleford Tigers season was the club's 2nd year in the Super League. The club finished in 10th place. Castleford Tigers also competed in the Challenge Cup, but were knocked out in the Fourth Round by Salford Reds.

Table

Squad

Transfers

In

Out

References

External links

Castleford Tigers - Rugby League Project

Castleford Tigers seasons
Castleford Tigers